Heteralepadidae is a family of goose barnacles.

Genera
The World Register of Marine Species includes the following genera in the family :
 Alepas Rang, 1829
 Heteralepas Pilsbry, 1907
 Koleolepas Stebbing, 1900
 Paralepas Pilsbry, 1907

References

Barnacles
Crustacean families